John Jervis (1826–1860) was an English politician.

The son of John Jervis, he was briefly a Member of Parliament (MP) for Horsham from 28 July 1847 until his election was declared void on 23 March 1848.

References

1826 births
1860 deaths
Members of the Parliament of the United Kingdom for English constituencies
UK MPs 1847–1852